Shoghlabad or Shaghlabad may refer to:
 Shoghlabad, Kerman
 Shoghlabad, Razavi Khorasan